Veniamin Mikhailovich Blazhenny, real surname Eisenstadt (15 October 1921, Kopys – 31 July 1999, Minsk) was a Belarusian Christian poet. His literary pseudonym, "Blazhenny" means Fool for Christ or "blessed".

Biography 
Blazhenny was born in a poor Jewish family. After studying for a year in the Vitebsk Teachers' Institute (the Institute was evacuated during World War II in 1941), he worked as a history teacher. In 1946, he returned to Belarus and lived in Minsk. He worked as a bookbinder and a photographer in a manufacture team for people with disabilities. He started writing his first poetry in 1943 and had a correspondence with Boris Pasternak, Viktor Shklovsky and Arseny Tarkovsky who admitted his talent. However, his work remained unpublished and unknown to the public due to censorship and other publishing constraints in the Soviet Union. Being on the lowest-paying jobs and having his poetry unpublished, Blazenny lived in extreme poverty and was involuntary incarcerated in a Soviet psychiatric institution for having a "delusion" that he was a poet. Blazhenny remained bedridden during the last years of his life and survived because of help from his wife. He died two weeks after her death

The first journal publications by Blazhenny appeared in 1982, and his first book was published only in 1990. He became a central figure of Russian poetry circles in Minsk and influenced other authors, including Dmitry Strotsev. His poetry was set to music and frequently performed as songs by Elena Frolova.

His poetry attracted attention by strong spiritual component and emotion. The most common subjects of his poetry include love, pity, death, destiny and appeal to God. His lyrical hero often complains to God for the suffering of all the small creatures of the world, including people and animals. Sometimes he appears as a yurodivy who sleeps with homeless cats and dogs, suffers from the cold and hunger, bitterly complains to the higher powers for misfortune, and finally dies, but his spirit remains:

References

External links
Links to publications about him in Russian Journal
Some of his publications
Some of his poetry
Veniamin Blazhenny in electronic library of Yakov Krotov

1921 births
1999 deaths
People from Orsha District
Belarusian Jews
Belarusian male poets
Russian-language poets
Christian poets
20th-century Belarusian poets
20th-century Russian male writers
Soviet poets